The 1979 Kaduna State gubernatorial election occurred on July 28, 1979. PRP's Abdulkadir Balarabe Musa won election for a first term to become Kaduna State's first executive governor leading by 45.14%, defeating NPN's Lawal Kaita who got 44.42% and the GNPP candidate with 10.44%, in the contest.

Abdulkadir Balarabe Musa emerged the PRP flag bearer in the primary election. His running mate was Abba Musa Rimi.

Electoral system
The Governor of Kaduna State is elected using the plurality voting system.

Results
Three of the five political parties registered by the Federal Electoral Commission (FEDECO) participated in the election. Abdulkadir Balarabe Musa of the PRP won the contest by polling 45.14% of the votes, and was closely followed NPN's candidate, Lawal Kaita. There were 3,420,839 registered electorates. The total votes cast was 1,241,437.

References 

Kaduna State gubernatorial elections
Gubernatorial election 1979
Kaduna State gubernatorial election